Onions is a surname, also spelled O'Nions. Notable persons with that surname include:

 Alfred Onions (1858-1921), Welsh politician and trade unionist
 Charles Talbut Onions (1873–1965), English grammarian and lexicographer
 George Onions (1883–1944), English recipient of the Victoria Cross
 Graham Onions (born 1982), English cricketer
 Keith O'Nions (born 1944), British scientist, president and rector of Imperial College London
 Oliver Onions (1873–1961), English novelist
 Sheila O'Nions Walsh (1928–2009), English novelist, also known as Sheila Walsh and Sophie Leyton

Surnames